The Sindhri mango is a mango cultivar grown in Sindhri, a town in Sindh, and other areas of Sindh province in Pakistan. It is a large oval shaped mango which is extremely sweet and aromatic. 

It is considered the Queen of Mangoes because of its taste.

See also 
List of mango cultivars

References

Mango cultivars
Mango cultivars of Pakistan
Mirpur Khas District